Donald Le Roy Crow (born August 18, 1958) is a former catcher in Major League Baseball. He played in four games for the Los Angeles Dodgers during the 1982 season, recording four at-bats without getting a hit.

Crow attended Washington State University, where he played college baseball for the Cougars from 1977–1979.

References

External links

Major League Baseball catchers
Los Angeles Dodgers players
Baseball players from Washington (state)
1958 births
Living people
San Antonio Dodgers players
Albuquerque Dukes players
Washington State Cougars baseball players
Mat-Su Miners players